The 2017 Laurie O'Reilly Cup was the tenth edition of the competition and was held on 13 June at Christchurch. It was the first time the Black Ferns and the Wallaroos had played in the South Island since 1997. The match was part of the June International series that was hosted by New Zealand who played against Australia, Canada, and England. The June tests was to help provide quality matches as the teams prepared for the upcoming Rugby World Cup in Ireland.

New Zealand retained the O'Reilly Cup after thrashing Australia 44–17.

Match

References 

Laurie O'Reilly Cup
Australia women's national rugby union team
New Zealand women's national rugby union team
Laurie O'Reilly Cup